Kickboxing was a demonstration sport at the 2007 Asian Indoor Games was held in Macau, China from 26 October to 27 October 2007.

The domination of Kazakhstan both in full contact and low-kick was overwhelming: seven gold medals, three silver and 4 bronze in 10 weight divisions. Kuwait won four gold medals, 1 silver and 3 bronze in point fighting (semi contact), while Jordan was third overall with 3 gold medals (2 in the ring and 1 on the tatami), 4 silver and 6 bronze. Kyrgyzstan, India, Iraq, Mongolia and Uzbekistan won the remaining medals.

Medalists

Point fighting

Full contact

Low kick

Medal table

Results

Point fighting

57 kg

63 kg

69 kg

74 kg

79 kg

Full contact

57 kg

63 kg

71 kg

75 kg

86 kg

Low kick

57 kg

63 kg

71 kg

75 kg

86 kg

References
 World Association of Kickboxing
 Official Results - Day 1
 Official Results - Day 2

2007
2007 Asian Indoor Games events
Asian Indoor and Martial Arts Games